There are many lakes named Long Lake in British Columbia, Canada.

They are, (in alphabetic order):
Long Lake (Batchelor), located in the area of the Batchelor Range northwest of Kamloops at 
Long Lake (Bella Coola), southeast of Thunder Mountain on the upland to the north of the Bella Coola Valley, at  
Long Lake (Big Bar), located east of Big Bar Ferry west of White Lake at 
Long Lake (Cassiar), south of Gallic Lake, northeast of McDame Lake, at  
Long Lake (Cheslatta), located south of Francois Lake near Cheslatta IR No. 1, at 
Long Lake (Chilcotin), southwest of Williams Lake in the eastern Chilcotin to the north of Riske Creek, located at 
Long Lake (East Kootenay), northwest of Windermere Lake in the East Kootenay region, at 
Long Lake (Itcha), south of Itcha Ilgachuz Provincial Park and east of Charlotte Lake, at  
Long Lake (Kamloops), between Barriere and Adams Lake, northwest of Kamloops, at 
Long Lake (Ladysmith), at 
Long Lake (Lillooet Ranges), at 
Long Lake (Lindeman), at the south end of Lindeman Lake, at 
Long Lake (Moose Valley), located east of Moose Valley Provincial Park in the South Cariboo at 
Long Lake (Peace Country), south of the Redwillow River in the Peace River Country, at 
Long Lake (Pennask), between Peachland (SE) and Pennask Lake (NW), adjacent to the Okanagan Connector, at 
Long Lake (Port McNeill), located west of Port McNeill and southeast of Port Hardy at 
Long Lake (Prince George), south of Huble Creek, northwest of Prince George, at 
Long Lake (Smith Inlet), located south of Smith Inlet at 
Long Lake (Vancouver Island), northeast of Ladysmith Harbour at 
Long Lake (Wellington), in the Wellington area of Nanaimo at

References

Lakes of British Columbia